Rajiv Hari Om Bhatia (born 9 September 1967), known professionally as Akshay Kumar, is an Indian-born naturalised Canadian actor and film producer who works in Hindi cinema. In over 30 years of acting, Kumar has appeared in over 100 films and has won several awards, including two National Film Awards and two Filmfare Awards. He received the Padma Shri, India's fourth-highest civilian honour, from the Government of India in 2009. Kumar is one of the most prolific actors in Indian cinema. Forbes included Kumar in their lists of both highest-paid celebrities and highest-paid actors in the world from 2015 to 2020. Between 2019 and 2020, he was the only Indian on both lists.

Kumar began his career in 1991 with Saugandh and had his first commercial success a year later with the action thriller Khiladi. The film established him as an action star in the 1990s and led to several films in the Khiladi film series, in addition to other action films such as Mohra (1994) and Jaanwar (1999). Although his early tryst with romance in Yeh Dillagi (1994) was positively received, it was in the next decade that Kumar expanded his range of roles. He gained recognition for the romantic films Dhadkan (2000), Andaaz (2003), Namastey London (2007), and for his slapstick comic performances in several films including Hera Pheri (2000), Mujhse Shaadi Karogi (2004), Phir Hera Pheri (2006), Bhool Bhulaiyaa (2007), and Singh Is Kinng (2008). Kumar won Filmfare Awards for his negative role in Ajnabee (2001) and his comic performance in Garam Masala (2005).

While his career had fluctuated commercially, his mainstream success soared in 2007 with four consecutive box-office hits; it was consistent until a short period of decline between 2009 and 2011, after which he reinforced his status with several films, including Rowdy Rathore (2012) and Holiday (2014). Moreover, around this time critical response to several of his films improved; his work in Special 26 (2013), Baby (2015) and Airlift (2016) was acclaimed, and he won the National Film Award for Best Actor for the crime thriller Rustom (2016). He earned further notice for his self-produced social films Toilet: Ek Prem Katha (2017) and Pad Man (2018), as well as the war film Kesari (2019), and set box-office records in 2019 with Mission Mangal, Housefull 4, Good Newwz, and the 2021 action film Sooryavanshi.

In addition to acting, Kumar has worked as a stunt actor. In 2008, He started hosting Fear Factor: Khatron Ke Khiladi and hosted four seasons. He also launched the TV reality show Dare 2 Dance in 2014 and his off-screen work includes ownership of the team Khalsa Warriors in the World Kabaddi League. The actor had also set up martial arts training schools for women safety in the country. Kumar is one of the India's most philanthropic actor and supports various charities. He is a leading brand endorser celebrity in India.

Sometime during or after the 2011 Canadian federal election, the Conservative government granted Canadian citizenship to Kumar by invoking a little-known law which allowed circumventing the usual residency requirement for Canadian immigrants. According to a former Conservative Party minister, Tony Clement, the citizenship was awarded in return for Kumar's offer of putting his "star power to use to advance Canada-Indian relations", and Canada's "trade relations, commercial relations, in the movie sector, in the tourism sector".

Early life and background 
Kumar was born in Amritsar, Punjab, India, to Hari Om Bhatia and Aruna Bhatia in a Punjabi family. His father was an army officer. From a young age, Kumar was very interested in sports. His father too enjoyed wrestling. He lived and grew up in Delhi's Chandni Chowk and later he moved to Bombay (present-day Mumbai) when his father left Army to become an accountant with UNICEF. Soon, his sister was born and the family lived in Koliwada, a Punjabi dominated area of Central Bombay.

He received his school education from Don Bosco High School, Matunga, simultaneously learning Karate. He enrolled in Guru Nanak Khalsa College for higher education, but dropped out as he was not much interested in studies. He requested his father that he wanted to learn martial arts further, and his father somehow saved money to send him to Thailand. Kumar went to Bangkok to learn martial arts and lived in Thailand for five years learning Thai Boxing. Kumar also has a sister, Alka Bhatia. When Kumar was a teenager, his father asked him what he aspired to be. Kumar expressed his desire to become an actor.

After having obtained a black belt in Taekwondo while in India, he studied martial arts in Bangkok, Thailand, where he learned Muay Thai and worked as a chef and waiter. After Thailand, Kumar went to work in Calcutta (present-day Kolkata) in a travel agency, in Dhaka in a hotel as a chef and Delhi where he sold Kundan jewellery. Upon his return to Bombay, he commenced the teaching of martial arts.

During this time, the father of one of his students, himself a model co-ordinator, recommended Kumar into modelling which ultimately led to a modelling assignment for a furniture showroom. Kumar effectively made more money within the first two days of shooting than in his entire month's salary, and therefore chose a modelling career path. He worked as an assistant for photographer Jayesh Sheth for 18 months without payment to shoot his first portfolio. He also worked as a background dancer in various films. One morning, he missed his flight for an ad-shoot in Bangalore. Disappointed with himself, he visited a film studio along with his portfolio. That evening, Kumar was signed for a lead role by producer Pramod Chakravarthy for the movie Deedar.

Film career

1991–1999: Debut, breakthrough and action films 

Kumar made his first appearance as the lead actor opposite Raakhee and Shantipriya in Saugandh (1991). In the same year, he acted in Kishore Vyas-directed Dancer, which received poor reviews. The following year he starred in Abbas Mustan-directed suspense thriller, Khiladi, widely considered his breakthrough role. A review in The Indian Express called the film "an engrossing thriller" and described Kumar as impressive in the lead part, noting his physical appearance, strong screen presence, and commending him for being "perfectly at ease". His next release was the Raj Sippy-directed detective film Mr. Bond, based on James Bond. His last release of 1992 was Deedar. It failed to perform well at the box office.

In 1993, he acted in the Keshu Ramsay-directed bilingual film Ashaant alongside Dr. Vishnuvardhan and Ashwini Bhave. All of his films released during 1993, including Dil Ki Baazi, Kayda Kanoon, Waqt Hamara Hai and Sainik did not perform well commercially. In 1994, he appeared in 11 feature films. He played a police inspector in two films: Sameer Malkan's Main Khiladi Tu Anari and Rajiv Rai's Mohra, both among the highest-grossing films of the year. Further success came later that year when he starred in Yash Chopra-produced romance Yeh Dillagi, opposite Kajol. One of the year's biggest mainstream successes, both the film and his performance were received well by critics, with The Indian Express describing him as "always dependable" and singling out his performance. His work in the film earned him his first nomination for Best Actor at the Filmfare Awards and Star Screen award. During the same year, Kumar also had success with films like Suhaag and the low-budget action film Elaan. All these achievements established Kumar as one of the most successful actors of the year, according to Box Office India.

Kumar proved to have success with what later became known as the Khiladi series. He starred in the fourth and fifth action thriller films with Khiladi in the title: Sabse Bada Khiladi (1995) and Khiladiyon Ka Khiladi (1996), both directed by Umesh Mehra and released to commercial success. He played a dual role in the former. Khiladiyon Ka Khiladi co-starred Rekha and Raveena Tandon. During the film's shooting Kumar was injured, and went on to receive treatment in United States. Shubhra Gupta of The Indian Express wrote in a year-end review, "It was Akshay Kumar in Khiladiyon Ka Khiladi who packed the aisles, no doubt about it... He shoved his hair back in a slick little ponytail, much like Steven Segal, wore ankle-length great coats, wrestled with the fearsome Undertaker, and walked away with the film."

Kumar played a supporting role in Yash Chopra-directed musical romantic drama, Dil To Pagal Hai (1997), co-starring Shah Rukh Khan, Madhuri Dixit and Karisma Kapoor, for which he received his first nomination for the Filmfare Award for Best Supporting Actor. In the same year, he starred opposite Juhi Chawla in David Dhawan-directed comedy Mr. and Mrs. Khiladi, fifth instalment of the Khiladi series. Unlike his previous films of the series, it failed commercially. Considerable success, however, came with another dual role in the romantic action film Aflatoon. Khalid Mohamed of Filmfare, while critical of the film, approved of Kumar's effort: "Akshay Kumar comes to life. Given something even slightly different to do, he does rise to the occasion." His following releases failed in commercial terms and this caused a setback to his film career. In 1999, Kumar played opposite Twinkle Khanna in International Khiladi. The film did not do well at the box office. He received critical acclaim for his roles in the films Sangharsh and Jaanwar. Whilst the former did not make a profit at the box office, the latter turned out to be a commercial success and marked his comeback.

2000–2006: Hera Pheri and expansion to comedy and romantic films 

In 2000, Kumar starred in the Priyadarshan-directed comedy Hera Pheri alongside Paresh Rawal and Suneil Shetty. The film which was a remake of Malayalam film Ramji Rao Speaking, became a commercial success and proved to be a turning point in Kumar's career. Hindustan Times noted the film's "intense portrayal of the surreality of the human condition". He also starred in the Dharmesh Darshan-directed romantic drama Dhadkan later that same year. The film performed moderately at the box office but Kumar was praised for his acting. Rediff.coms review stated that he had proved that he is "director's actor" and that "he has worked hard on his role is apparent." That same year, he performed some of his most dangerous stunts in Neeraj Vora-directed action thriller Khiladi 420, where he climbed a running plane, stood on top of the plane flying a thousand feet in the air, and jumped from the plane onto a hot air balloon. In a later scene, he is also seen being chased by a car, dodging bullets, jumping off buildings, and climbing walls. His character in the film had two names and his role received mixed reviews. Sukanya Verma wrote "Negative roles and Akshay Kumar don't go hand-in-hand. [...] Akshay is ridiculously over the top and irritating to the core. However, he manages a decent performance as the sober and suave Anand." Padmaraj Nair of Screen, however, believed it was "the best performance of his career".

His first release in 2001 was Suneel Darshan-directed drama Ek Rishtaa: The Bond of Love. Kumar was praised for his performance in the film. Next, he played a negative role in the Abbas Mustan-directed film Ajnabee. While reviewing the film for Rediff.com, Sarita Tanwar termed Kumar the "surprise package" of the film. She added that he was "in total control as the bad guy." The film won him his first Filmfare Award for Best Villain and IIFA award 2002 for Performance in a Negative Role.

His first release in 2002 was Dharmesh Darshan-directed romantic drama Haan Maine Bhi Pyaar Kiya. He played the role as a blind man in Vipul Amrutlal Shah and Shaarang Dev Pandit-directed heist film Aankhen, co-starring Amitabh Bachchan, Arjun Rampal, Aditya Pancholi, Sushmita Sen and Paresh Rawal. His performance in the film was critically acclaimed. Next, he starred in the Vikram Bhatt-directed comedy Awara Paagal Deewana. Rediff.com's review of the film mentioned that his sincerity and intensity seen in Hera Pheri, Ek Rishtaa – The Bond of Love and Aankhen "seems missing". His last film of the year was Rajkumar Kohli-directed supernatural horror film Jaani Dushman: Ek Anokhi Kahani alongside Manisha Koirala, Sunil Shetty, Sunny Deol, Aftab Shivdasani, Arshad Warsi, Aditya Pancholi and Armaan Kohli. The film was a remake of Kohli's former film Naagin and received mostly negative reviews from critics. Taran Adarsh wrote "only Munish[Armaan] Kohli and Akshay Kumar leave an impact." In 2003, he starred in Suneel Darshan's action film Talaash: The Hunt Begins... opposite Kareena Kapoor. While reviewing the film, Taran Adarsh wrote "Akshay Kumar is plain mediocre. The role hardly offers him scope to try out anything different." Next, he starred in Raj Kanwar-directed romantic drama Andaaz alongside Lara Dutta and Priyanka Chopra. The film received mixed reviews from critics, but turned out to be a commercial success at the box office and the first universal hit of 2003.

In 2004 Kumar starred in Rajkumar Santoshi's action drama thriller Khakee alongside Amitabh Bachchan, Ajay Devgn and Aishwarya Rai. Kumar played the role of Inspector Shekhar Verma, a corrupt, morally bankrupt cop who changes himself during a mission to transfer an accused Pakistani spy Dr. Iqbal Ansari (played by Atul Kulkarni) from a remote town in Maharashtra to Mumbai. The film and Kumar's acting were positively reviewed by critics. He was nominated for the Filmfare Best Supporting Actor Award for his role in the film. His other releases included Dileep Shukla's crime film Police Force: An Inside Story. He starred alongside Raveena Tandon, Amrish Puri and Raj Babbar. The film's production was delayed following the break-up of the lead actors Tandon and Kumar. Upon release it received negative reviews from critics. Next, Kumar played Hari Om Patnaik, an IPS officer in Madhur Bhandarkar-directed Aan: Men at Work. He starred in David Dhawan-directed romantic comedy Mujhse Shaadi Karogi alongside Salman Khan and Priyanka Chopra. He played the role of Sunny, Sameer (played by Khan)'s roommate who pursuits Rani (played by Chopra)-Sameer's love interest. The film received positive reviews. Taran Adarsh praised Kumar and wrote "Akshay Kumar is a revelation [...] he surpasses his previous work. His timing is fantastic and the conviction with which he carries off the evil streak in his personality is bound to be talked-about in days to come." His performance in the film earned him his third nomination for supporting actor at the Filmfare Awards as well as a nomination for best comic role. His other films included Abbas-Mustan directed Aitraaz and S M Iqbal's Meri Biwi Ka Jawaab Nahin. In the former, Kumar played against type as a worker wrongly accused of sexual harassment by his female boss played by Chopra. According to the directors, Aitraaz was inspired by National Basketball Association player Kobe Bryant (who was accused of rape by a fan); and the film's development began when they read about his sexual-assault case in the newspapers. Talking about the character Kumar said that it is realistic and could be described as a "new-age metrosexual" man. He added that Aitraaz was the boldest film he had done. In the latter, he starred opposite Sridevi. The film was shot in 1994 but was released in 2004 after a delay of 10 years.

The next year Kumar starred in Dharmesh Darshan-directed romantic drama musical film Bewafaa (2005) opposite Kareena Kapoor. He played the role of Raja, an aspiring musician who pursues his love interest Anjali (played by Kareena Kapoor) even after she is married to Aditya Sahai (played by Anil Kapoor). The film received mixed reviews from film critic but Kumar was praised for his acting. Anupama Chopra of India Today wrote that "Kareena Kapoor and Kumar stand out." Taran Adarsh wrote "Akshay Kumar does well in a role that fits him like a glove." Later that year he acted in Vipul Amrutlal Shah's family drama Waqt: The Race Against Time alongside Amitabh Bachchan, another Priyadarshan-directed comedy Garam Masala alongside John Abraham. Waqt: The Race Against Time was a family drama film. The film and Kumar's acting received mixed reviews. Vishal D'Souza wrote "Akshay shoulders an author-backed role, carrying more of the film's emotional baggage though he is distinctly uncomfortable in the soppy-weepy scenes." The films succeeded at the box office and his performance in the latter earned him his second Filmfare Award, for Best Comedian. His other films included Vikram Bhatt-directed action comedy romance film Deewane Huye Paagal and Suneel Darshan directed romantic drama Dosti: Friends Forever. In the former he starred alongside Shahid Kapoor, Sunil Shetty and Rimi Sen while in the latter he starred alongside Kareena Kapoor and Bobby Deol. Both of these films received positive reviews.

Kumar's first release of 2006 was Rajkumar Santoshi-directed drama Family – Ties of Blood followed by Suneel Darshan's Mere Jeevan Saathi and Raj Kanwar's Humko Deewana Kar Gaye. Next, he starred in a sequel to Hera Pheri titled Phir Hera Pheri. As was the former, the sequel became a huge success at the box office. Later that year he starred alongside Salman Khan and Preity Zinta in the Shirish Kunder-directed romantic musical film Jaan-E-Mann. The film was a well anticipated release, and despite receiving positive reviews from critics, did not do as well as expected at the box office. The film received mostly negatively reviews. Vidya Pradhan of Rediff.com called it a "bizarre movie." Though the film under-performed, his role as a shy, lovable nerd was praised. He ended the year with Priyadarshan's comedy murder mystery film Bhagam Bhag. He starred alongside Lara Dutta, Govinda and Paresh Rawal and played the character of a theatre actor. The film received mixed reviews and Rediff.com called Kumar the real hero of the film. The film was commercially successful. The same year, he led the Heat 2006 world tour along with fellow stars Saif Ali Khan, Preity Zinta, Sushmita Sen and Celina Jaitley.

2007–2011: Commercial success and professional setbacks 

2007 proved to be Kumar's most successful year during his career in the industry, and as described by box office analysts, "probably the best ever recorded by an actor, with four outright hits and no flops." His first release, Vipul Amrutlal Shah-directed Namastey London, was critically and commercially successful, and his performance earned him a Best Actor nomination at the Filmfare. Critic Taran Adarsh wrote of his performance in the film, "he's sure to win the hearts of millions of moviegoers with a terrific portrayal in this film." Kumar's chemistry with lead actress Katrina Kaif also generated immense appreciation, with Nikhat Kazmi of The Times of India describing their pairing as "refreshing." His next two releases, Sajid Khan-directed Heyy Babyy and Priyadarshan's Bhool Bhulaiyaa, were box office successes as well. In both of these films he starred opposite Vidya Balan. Kumar's last release of the year, the Anees Bazmee-directed Welcome, did extremely well at the box office, receiving a blockbuster status and simultaneously becoming his fifth successive hit. All of Kumar's films which released that year did well in the overseas market as well. Kumar appeared in a cameo role in Farah Khan directed Om Shanti Om. His role was listed as no. 3 on the Top 10 Cameos in Bollywood list of MensXP.com.

Kumar's first film of 2008, Vijay Krishna Acharya-directed action thriller Tashan, marked his comeback to the Yash Raj Films banner after 11 years. Although a poll (conducted by Bollywood Hungama) named it the most anticipated release of the year, the film under-performed at the box office grossing  in India. His second film, Bazmee-directed Singh Is Kinng in which he starred opposite Kaif was a huge success at the box office and broke the first-week worldwide record of Om Shanti Om, the previous highest figure. His next film was the animated film Jumbo, directed by Kompin Kemgumnird. The year also saw Kumar making his small screen debut as the host of the successful show Fear Factor – Khatron Ke Khiladi. He later returned to host the show's second season in 2009.

In 2009, Kumar featured opposite Deepika Padukone in the Warner Bros. and Rohan Sippy production Chandni Chowk to China. Directed by Nikhil Advani, the film was a critical and commercial failure at the box office. Kumar's next release was 8 x 10 Tasveer, an action-thriller directed by Nagesh Kukunoor that failed commercially. His next release was Sabbir Khan's battle-of-the-sexes comedy Kambakkht Ishq. Set in Los Angeles, it was the first Indian film to be shot at Universal Studios and featured cameo appearances by Hollywood actors. The film was poorly received by critics but became an economic success, earning over  worldwide. Kumar's film Blue was released on 16 October 2009. Blue received negative reviews and collected about ₹ 420 million at the box office. His last release in 2009 was Priyadarshan's De Dana Dan. He starred alongside Katrina Kaif, Suniel Shetty and Paresh Rawal. Kumar played a servant who plans to kidnap his owner's dog. The film received mixed reviews.

He then appeared in the 2010 comedy, Housefull, directed by Sajid Khan which garnered the second-highest opening weekend collection of all time. Kumar's next release was Khatta Meetha, directed by Priyadarshan which was an average grosser. The film received negative reviews. Rajeev Masand of CNN-IBN called it a schizophrenic film.
He also appeared in Vipul Shah's Action Replayy, which was a box office failure. The film received mostly negative reviews. His last film of 2010 was Tees Maar Khan. Directed by Farah Khan, the film received poor critical reviews but became moderately successful.

In 2011 he starred in Patiala House and Thank You. His last film of 2011 was Rohit Dhawan-directed Desi Boyz (2011), which co-starred John Abraham, Chitrangada Singh and Deepika Padukone. He also co-produced a film with Russell Peters titled Breakaway (dubbed into Hindi as Speedy Singhs) which is reminiscent of his own Patiala House. Breakaway became the highest-grossing cross-cultural movie of 2011 in Canada. Kumar dubbed for the role of Optimus Prime in the Hindi version of Hollywood, action blockbuster, Transformers: Dark of the Moon. He took the dubbing role for his son, Aarav, and did so for free.

2012: Resurgence 

His first release of 2012 was Housefull 2, a sequel of his earlier comedy film Housefull, which became Superhit. Kumar's next film was the Prabhudeva-directed action drama Rowdy Rathore in which he played a double role opposite Sonakshi Sinha. In 2012, he founded another production company called Grazing Goat Pictures Pvt Ltd.

Joker was reportedly promoted as Kumar's 100th film, but later Akshay Kumar clarified that the 100th film landmark had been crossed long before he even signed up for Joker. "It was a miscalculation on Shirish's part. OMG is my 116th film," he said. Kumar kept himself away from the film's promotion due to differences with Kunder. Reacting to Kumar's backing out from the film's promotion Kunder tweeted "A true leader takes responsibility for his team and leads them through thick and thin. Never abandons them and runs away." He later deleted the tweet. His later release Oh My God which he produced and starred along with Paresh Rawal. It had a slow opening but because of word of mouth it picked up. His last release in 2012 was Khiladi 786, the eighth instalment in his famous Khiladi series as well as the comeback of the series after 12 years. Although film was panned by critics it grossed 700 million at the domestic box office.

2013–present: Other critical and commercial success 

His first release in 2013 was Special Chabbis which earned a positive critical reception and was moderately successful at the box office. Although the movie earned him positive reviews and commercial success, trade analysts noted that the movie could have done much better business due to its good content and Kumar's high-profile. Milan Luthria chose Kumar to play the character of Shoaib Khan (based on Dawood Ibrahim) in the gangster film Once Upon ay Time in Mumbai Dobaara!, sequel to Once Upon a Time in Mumbaai. It proved to be a below average at the box office. The film was declared a "flop" by Box Office India. It received mixed reviews however Kumar's acting was praised by a majority of critics. In a review for Hindustan Times, Anupama Chopra wrote that Kumar "makes a stellar killer". Madhureeta Mukherjee of The Times of India praised Kumar's performance and said that "Bhai act with flamboyance and mojo ... He gets a chance to do what he does best – herogiri (albeit less menacing, more entertaining), with charisma and clap-trap dialoguebaazi." Al Pacino saw the film's trailer and promos and admired Kumar's portrayal of Shoaib Khan, a gangster. He said that the promos and posters reminded him of his own The Godfather. Kumar said of Pacino's response: "A touch of appreciation is always held dearly in an actor's arms, even if it's from the simplest of people like our beloved spot boys. But to have your work spoken of so kindly by the world's most admired gangster Al Pacino himself – I had goose-bumps thinking about him watching the promo! I was so humbled, not only as an actor but as a fan of his legendary work." Rajeev Masand of CNN-IBN criticized Kumar for his "in-your-face flamboyance". After the film's mainly negative reviews, Kumar lashed out at critics, accusing them of lacking an understanding of the audience and the basic ideas of filmmaking. Kumar received a nomination for Best Actor in a Negative Role at Zee Cine Awards.

His next release was Anthony D Souza's Boss alongside Shiv Panditt and Aditi Rao Hydari. The movie received mixed reviews; it performed poorly at the box office netting  domestically. Kumar came back strongly with Holiday: A Soldier Is Never Off Duty, the Hindi remake of the 2012 Tamil film Thuppakki. This action drama earned both critical and commercial success entering the 1 billion elite club and became the highest grosser of 2014. He then starred in Entertainment and has sung a song for the film. Making of the song has been uploaded on YouTube. His last film of 2014 was The Shaukeens. He appeared as himself in it and produced it. He then played the lead role in the thrillers Baby and Gabbar is Back. Kumar's first collaboration with Karan Johar, Brothers was released on 14 August 2015. His next release was Singh is Bling, a quasi sequel to 2008's Singh is Kinng was released on 2 October 2015 and is produced by Grazing Goats Pictures.

His first release was Airlift released on 22 January 2016 was critically and commercially successful, and second was Housefull 3 which released on 3 June 2016. Rustom which was produced by Neeraj Pandey and marked his third release of 2016. Akshay was praised for his performance in Rustom which garnered him numerous award nominations. Rustom grossed more than 2 billion at the box office. Both Airlift and Rustom earned him the National Film Award for Best Actor.

His second film release in 2017 was Toilet: Ek Prem Katha. This film depicted the serious social issue of toilets in certain regions of the country. Akshay's performance was praised. Akshay Kumar dug a toilet in Madhya Pradesh to promote the film. The movie trailer was released on 11 June 2017. Indian Prime Minister Narendra Modi called it a good effort to further the message of cleanliness, as per Swachh Bharat Abhiyan.

In 2018, Akshay starred in another social drama film Pad Man alongside Sonam Kapoor and Radhika Apte. He later made his Tamil cinema debut in the science fiction thriller 2.0, a standalone sequel to the 2010 film Enthiran, co-starring Rajinikanth, in which he played an evil ornithologist named Pakshirajan.

In 2019, Kumar appeared in Karan Johar's film Kesari opposite Parineeti Chopra, based on the story of the Battle of Saragarhi. The film grossed over  worldwide. He next featured in Mission Mangal with an ensemble cast of Vidya Balan, Taapsee Pannu, Nithya Menen, Sharman Joshi and Sonakshi Sinha. The film is about the story of scientists at Indian Space Research Organisation who contributed to the Mars Orbiter Mission, which marked India's first interplanetary expedition. Housefull 4, directed by Farhad Samji, was released in October 2019. His next release in December 2019 was Karan Johar's and his own production Good Newwz, a romantic comedy about surrogacy, opposite Kareena Kapoor Khan. All of his four films were commercially successful this year with three consecutive domestic 200 Crore Club net films alongside Mission Mangal, Housefull 4 and Good Newwz.

His only release in 2020 was the horror comedy Laxmii, directed by Raghava Lawrence, an official remake of the Tamil film Kanchana opposite Kiara Advani. It was released on 9 November on Disney+ Hotstar, and was not released theatrically in India due to the COVID-19 pandemic. The film revolves around a man who gets possessed by the ghost of a transgender. It received mixed to negative reviews from critics, praising the performance of Kumar, but criticised the writing and screenplay of the film.

In 2021, Kumar had three releases, namely, Bell Bottom, a spy thriller inspired from real life hijacking events in India by Khalistani separatists during the 1980s, directed by Ranjit M Tewari, Sooryavanshi, a Cop Universe continuation of Singham and Simmba, directed by Rohit Shetty and Aanand L. Rai's Atrangi Re along with Sara Ali Khan in dual roles opposite him and Dhanush on Disney+ Hotstar, were released in 2021.

In 2022, Kumar's first release was Bachchhan Paandey, a remake of Jigarthanda, where he played the titular role of a gangster, a name derived from Kumar's character in the 2008 film Tashan. The film paired him with Kriti Sanon, and also features Jacqueline Fernandez and Arshad Warsi. Despite an ensemble cast and hype among fans, Bachchhan Paandey gathered negative critical reception and was not successful at the box office.

His next release was the historical film Samrat Prithviraj, which was based on life of the Hindu warrior Prithviraj Chauhan. It also starred Sonu Sood, Sanjay Dutt and debutant Manushi Chhillar. Released theatrically on 3 June 2022, the film opened to mixed reviews. Anuj Kumar of The Hindu wrote 'In order to tone down his body language and accent, Kumar has lost much of his trademark energy and could not develop the gravitas required to play the celebrated ruler. He growls like a lion who has lost his bite and despite all the air-brushing, doesn't look like the boy who became a Samrat in his 20s'. Made on a budget of 300 crore, the film failed to perform well at the box office.

His another movie Rakshabandhan which was released on the extended weekend of 5 days on 11 August received mixed reviews. The Hindu wrote ''The film's engaging powerful anti-dowry sentiments, along with Akshay's brilliant comic timing, ensures that there is enough to keep the audience tied for two hours''. The Indian Express rated the film 1.5 out of 5 stars and wrote "Do the filmmakers truly believe that such low-rent family dramas, with their uneasy mix of humour and crassness". The film couldn't manage to impress the audience and scored poorly at the Indian ticket windows. The film managed to earn mere $4.2 million over the extended weekend.

His another release in 2022 was Cuttputlli, which was again a remake of Ratsasan. The movie was released directly on Disney+ Hotstar.

The Hindustan Times wrote “Akshay Kumar got a golden opportunity in the film “Ram Setu” by Abhishek Sharma released on 25th October 2022, as his character is unlike anything he has done in the recent past.  Ram Setu embraces the best of the Indiana Jones and National Treasure schools of storytelling with desi action” With the poor performance of Ram Setu, 2022 proved to be one of the worst years for Akshay in recent times.

His first release of 2023 was Selfiee, an official remake of Driving Licence, which also starred Emraan Hashmi, Diana Penty and Nushrratt Bharuccha. The film bombed at the box office continuing the streak of flops for the actor.
Akshay is currently shooting for Bade Miyan Chote Miyan, which also stars Tiger Shroff.

His other projects in 2023 includes OMG 2 - Oh my God 2 , a spiritual successor to OMG - Oh My God, the official remake of Soorarai Pottru , a biopic Capsule Gill and Vedat Marathe Veer Daudle Saat, his Marathi debut.    

Akshay has also started shooting for multiple projects set to release in 2024 which also includes the much awaited Hera Pheri sequel.

Personal life 

Kumar married Twinkle Khanna, the daughter of actors Rajesh Khanna and Dimple Kapadia, on 17 January 2001. Together they have a son,  and a daughter. He is known as a protective father and keeps his children away from the media. He stated that he wants to "give them a normal childhood." In 2009, while performing at a show for Levis at Lakme Fashion Week, Kumar asked Twinkle to unbutton his jeans. This incident sparked a controversy which led to a police case being filed against them.

Kumar was initially a religious, practising Shaiva Hindu who regularly visited shrines and temples across the country, including the famed Vaishno Devi Mandir, but in March 2020 he stated, "I don't believe in any religion. I only believe in being Indian".

Citizenship 
Sometime during or after the 2011 Canadian federal election, the Conservative government there granted Canadian citizenship to Kumar by invoking a little-known law which allowed circumventing the usual residency requirement for Canadian immigrants.  According to a former Conservative Party minister, Tony Clement, the citizenship was awarded in return for Kumar's offer of putting his "star power to use to advance Canada-Indian relations," and Canada's "trade relations, commercial relations, in the movie sector, in the tourism sector."  Although Kumar had earlier appeared in a campaign event for Conservative Prime Minister Stephen Harper in Brampton, Ontario, a city with a large Indo-Canadian population, and praised Harper, Clement denied that the citizenship was a reward for partisan support.   Kumar had received an honorary doctorate degree from the University of Windsor, and in a 2010 interview with the Economist claimed he had "dual citizenship."  He was one of the 15 international celebrities invited for the Olympics torch-bearer rally to Canada.

In December 2019, Kumar stated that he has applied for an Indian passport and plans to give up his Canadian citizenship.

Filmography

Production

Television and other work

Television 

In 2004, Kumar presented seven-part miniseries Seven Deadly Arts with Akshay Kumar for free, played master and learner as he introduces viewers to each of the seven part of martial arts-kalaripayattu, Shaolin Kung Fu, karate, taekwondo, aikido, Muay Thai, capoeira, the show aired on every following Sunday. The following year Kumar was awarded the highest Japanese honour of "Katana" and a sixth degree black belt in Kuyukai Gōjū-ryū karate.

Since 2008, Kumar started India's stunt/action reality game show – "Fear Factor: Khatron Ke Khiladi". He hosted Season 1, Season 2 and Season 4. The show was widely accepted and appreciated, became hugely successful in popular culture. It is still being run by Rohit Shetty.

In 2011, Kumar hosted India's first MasterChef television show on Star Plus, was viewed by 18.2 million viewers and went to prove that Indian audiences are open to experimenting and look forward to innovations in television entertainment.

In 2014, He hosted another reality show Dare 2 Dance as a mentor, which aired on Life OK from 6 September. It broke the norms of a regular dance format with a commitment of a ‘first of its kind. A dance show where trained and famed dancers wasn't judged only on the basis of their dance performances, but they had to perform stunts.survive on the dance floor.

In 2014, Kumar also produced a successful television serial Jamai Raja (2014), starring Ravi Dubey and Nia Sharma, which established them leading actors in Indian television industry.

In 2017, he judged The Great Indian Laughter Challenge with Mallika Dua, Hussain Dalal and Zakir Khan, later they were replaced by Sajid Khan and Shreyas Talpade. The show made many popular names including Vishwash Chauhan and Shyam Rangeela.

Kumar joined Bear Grylls for an episode in "Into The Wild", which aired on Discovery channel on September 14, 2020. The episode was second highest-rated show in the infotainment genre (Discovery Channel) in terms of TRP. 1.1 crore people watched the premiere on Discovery Network channels.

Fitness work and stage performances 
Kumar promotes health fitness and exercising, stays in shape with a combination of kickboxing, basketball, swimming and Parkour as well as working out. While in standard eighth he had started practising Karate. He intended to open a martial arts school and the state government of Maharashtra allotted land for the school in Bhayandar. 
 He helped Khanna with editing the drafts of her debut book Mrs Funnybones. He is a teetotaller but has endorsed for a liquor brand in the past. Half of the sum was given for daan (charity work), of which he has been doing more of in recent times.  In 2013, one of his fan travelled from Haryana to Mumbai, to meet him. The journey took him 42 days. When he reached Kumar's building, he was informed that Kumar was in Casablanca. The fan stayed outside the building for one week before Kumar met him. Kumar has come out in support and lauded the Sports Minister Rajyavardhan Singh Rathore for his stand against corruption. The minister said that the government entrusted CBI in the investigation against the corrupt officials in sports department.

On 9 August 2014, Kumar performed at his 500th live show. The show was held in O2 Arena in London as part of the inaugural function of the World Kabaddi League. His first live show was held in 1991 in Delhi. Kumar owns Bengal Warriors a team in the Indian Kabbadi League. Akshay Kumar sets himself on fire at his upcoming The End series launch with Prime Video, says he's a stuntman first and actor later.

In the media 

In Indian Media, he is referred as Khiladi or Khiladi Kumar for doing so many dangerous stunts by himself and also because of his Khiladi film series. In 2009, Madame Tussauds wanted to make his wax figure next because he has an international fan following. But he declined and said,"he don't want to be waxed because he does not think it is of that great importance". From 2015, he was continuously feathered in Forbes' highest paid actors top 10 list. In 2019, he was fourth highest paid actor in the world behind Dwayne Johnson, Chris Hemsworth and Robert Downey Jr. On the Forbes US list of World's 33rd Highest Earner with $65M. In 2020, He ranked sixth and only Indian actor in top 10 of highest paid actors list with $48.5M.

Kumar was named "Sexiest Man Alive" by People Magazine in 2008. Kumar was awarded with NDTV Imagine Best Entertainer of the Year 2007 by the Apsara Film & Television Producers Guild Awards (FTPGI). In 2009, he was awarded the highest Japanese honour of "Katana" and a sixth degree Black Belt in Kuyukai Gojuryu Karate. He was one of the 15 international celebrities invited for the Olympics torch-bearer rally to Canada in 2009. Kumar bagged the Ultimate Man of the Year at the prestigious GQ Awards in 2015. He won the HT Hottest Trendsetter (Male) award at the HT India's Most Stylish in 2019.

He has great brand value and holds strong credibility in the advertising world. In 2020, Kumar has topped the list with brand value of $118M he has seen a jump of 13% by previous years. According to Duff and Phelps, Kumar was third most valued celebrity with $139M in 2021. Kumar has endorsed brands including Thums Up, Honda, Tata Motors, Dollar, Harpic, Sparx, Livguard Battery, and Kajarai Tiles. He was also brand ambassador of Canada Tourism. Kumar ranked number 1 on TAM's list of most visible stars in TV ads with an average visibility of 37 hours per day across all channels since 2019 to 2022.

Kumar has significant fan following in Indian diaspora as well as in European and African countries. As of September 2022, He is most followed Indian actor on social media including Facebook, Twitter and Instagram. Memes from his comedy movies, especially his face expressions are hugely popular on social media. In 2019, interviewed Modi on TV, which concluded as controversies in social media, later he clarified that it was a personal interview as a common man, not political.

Since 2013, Kumar has been the Hindi film industry's highest advance taxpayer for six consecutive years. He paid  as advance tax payment in that year. In August 2022, he got a certificate from Income Tax department for being highest tax payer.

Kumar has criticized award functions and doesn't believe in it saying, "Organizers have asked me to perform at award nights. They said that they would pay me half the price and they would also give me an award. I replied saying, 'You pay me the whole amount and keep your award.'" He called National Film Award, most prestigious award of the country.

Kumar holds the Guinness World Records for the most 184 Selfies taken in three minutes at a promotional event of his film Selfiee in Mumbai. He talked to the media and termed it as a 'way of paying tribute' to his fans.

Philanthropy and social service 
Kumar is one of India's most philanthropic celebrities, does a lot of helps and donations, continues the good work offscreen with his philanthropy and services.  He and his co-star Tamannaah Bhatia donated all the clothes from their film 2014 Entertainment to an animal welfare charity. Youth Organisation in Defence of Animals (YODA) is an organisation which works for the welfare of street animals. He has also donated  to Salman Khan's Being Human Foundation. Kumar also had donated a sum of ₹9 million to drought hit farmers in Maharashtra in 2015, Khan himself tweeted on Twitter. Kumar also helped a contestant of TV reality show Khatron Ke Khiladi by giving him Rs. 25 lakh after knowing that the contestant needed the prize money of the show for his father's cancer treatment. He has also donated ₹5 million to aid drought affected people through the Maharashtra government's Jalyukt Shivar Abhiyan.  In March 2013, he started a 30-bed cancer shelter for policemen in Naigaon. In December 2013, Vishwas Nangre Patil, Additional Commissioner of Police, West Mumbai visited his gym along with several trainee officers. Acid attack survivor Laxmi Agarwal, on whose life Deepika Padukone's Chapaak was based is also an activist. Some years ago, she was struggling to make ends meet. Kumar came to her rescue and transferred Rs. 5 Lakh into her account so that she could fend for herself until she found a job, because medals, awards and certificates don't pay the bills.

He launched an insurance scheme for the registered stunt directors in 2017. The family of deceased stunt director Abdul Sattar Munna has received a compensation of Rs. 20 lakh under the same scheme. Now, the actor has been asked to help those stunt choreographers who are above 55 years of age and therefore, aren't eligible to have insurance in their name.

During the promotions of Rustom, Kumar expressed his wish of serving the nation but destiny held something else in store for him. He has played a soldier in Holiday and Kesari, a special agent in Baby and a naval officer in Rustom. The actor was applauded by many for showing his concern towards the families of 12 slain jawans of the Central Reserve Police Force (CRPF) who were killed in Chhattisgarh's Sukma district on Saturday, March 11, 2017. He donated Rs. 1.08 crore to the families of the martyred jawans.
In August 2016, Kumar had donated Rs. 80 lakh to the families of army men. He gave Rs 5 lakh to each family and said our soldiers need money along with “samman”. In October 2016, Akshay donated Rs. 9 lakh to the family of a martyred BSF jawan.

He also donated Rs. 1.5 crore to build the shelter for transgender persons in Chennai. He is supporting the construction of the home. Laxmii'''s director Raghava Lawrence shared the “good news” of the actor's new initiative with friends and fans along with some pictures on Facebook.

Kumar endorses Swachh Bharat Mission, Builds Toilets in Madhya Pradesh, he had previously posted a video on social media, talking about the importance of having individual toilets at home, His movie Toilet was also based on Toilet's importance. He was named Uttarakhand's brand ambassador for 'Swachhta Abhiyaan'.

In 2017, Kumar launched the Bharat Ke Veer app, with the help of the home ministry. The platform lets people send money directly to the bank accounts of family members of soldiers martyred in the line of duty. On The Kapil Sharma Show, Akshay said that he was only carrying out his responsibility as a citizen with the app. “Hum yeh kahenge, ki hum apna kartvaya nibhate hai… Jo shaheed hote hai, unka nuksaan hum kabhi bhar nahi paayenge. That is for sure. Sarkar unko jo deti hai, woh deti hai. Lekin, as a civilian, humara bhi toh kuch kartavya banta hai. Yeh aisa app hai… Na iske beech mein koi NGO hai, na koi sarkar hai,” he said.

In the aftermath of Pulwama terror attack on the CRPF jawans, Kumar came forward to help the families of those sacrificed their lives in the attack. He donated Rs. 15 Lakh to a martyred jawan's family and even urged his fans to do the same. He further pledged to donate Rs. 5 crore through ‘Bharat Ke Veer’ app. He additionally donated Rs. 9 Lakh each to the families of 12 CRPF jawans who were killed in Chhattisgarh.

In Mid-2020 when Kerala, Assam and Chennai were left devastated as they were hit by floods that severely affected several families as they lost their houses, land, crops, many people died. Kumar donated a sum of Rs. 1 crore each to not just Kerala but also Assam and Chennai. CM Sonowal thanks Kumar.

Kumar was one of the first personalities from Bollywood to contribute to the PM CARES Fund right at the start of the first wave of the COVID-19 pandemic in March 2020, He donated Rs. 25 crores to the Prime Minister's Fund and another crore to ex-cricketer Gautam Gambhir’s charity for the same cause. The former cricketer revealed on Twitter that Akshay Kumar had donated Rs. 1 crore to his foundation during the deadly second wave to help people affected by the novel coronavirus. Gambhir wrote, “Every help in this gloom comes as a ray of hope. Thanks a lot Akshay Kumar for committing Rs 1 crore to #GGF for food, meds and oxygen for the needy! God bless.”
In 2021, Kumar donated 1 crore for construction of a school building in Neeru Village of Bandipora district in Jammu and Kashmir.

 Awards and nominations 
Kumar has been recipient of two Filmfare Awards from 13 nominations: Best Villain for Ajnabee (2002) and Best Comedian for Garam Masala (2006), and a National Film Award for Best Actor for the films Rustom and Airlift (both 2016). In 2008, the University of Windsor conferred an honorary Doctorate of Law on Kumar in recognition of his contribution to Indian cinema. The following year, he was awarded the Padma Shri by the Government of India. In 2011, The Asian Awards honoured Kumar for his outstanding achievement in Cinema.

Notes

 References 

 External links 

 
 
 
 Collected news and commentary at The Times of India''

 
Hindi film producers
1967 births
Living people
Punjabi people
Male actors in Hindi cinema
Indian male film actors
Indian game show hosts
Indian male martial artists
Indian stunt performers
Canadian male actors of Indian descent
Canadian expatriate actors in India
Canadian male voice actors
Canadian game show hosts
Canadian Muay Thai practitioners
Canadian stunt performers
Canadian Hindus
Best Actor National Film Award winners
Filmfare Awards winners
International Indian Film Academy Awards winners
Zee Cine Awards winners
Recipients of the Padma Shri in arts
Don Bosco schools alumni
Traceurs
Male actors from Amritsar
Martial artists from Punjab, India
Canadian taekwondo practitioners